The X73900 is a diesel multiple unit (DMU) train type operated by the SNCF in France. They were built from 2001 to 2004 by Alsthom DDF. They are a version of the SNCF Class X 73500 equipped with train control systems for transborder services to Germany.

General Information
The trains are single railcars. The units were ordered joint with Deutsche Bahn, with their Class 641 units.

The trains have modern features which were new to TER trains, such as:
 PIS inside and out of the train
 Low floor section with wide doors, for those with poor mobility
 Air conditioning
 Stronger cab area for reduced crash damage

The trains can work in multiple of up to 3 sets.

They are numbered X 73901 - X73919.

Liveries
 TER Livery - Metallic Grey with Blue ends and TER logos. Most X 73500 carry this.
 DB Red - X73913 - X73915 wear a Red Deutsche Bahn livery with DB logos.

Use of X 73900
The units are used on services that operate into Germany from France.

They operate the following services:

 Saarbrücken - Strasbourg - Offenburg
 Metz - Saarbrücken
 Mulhouse - Müllheim - Freiburg im Breisgau

Gallery

Depots
The class is allocated to Strasbourg depot.

See also
 Alstom Coradia LINT

References

External links

73900
Alstom Coradia
Diesel multiple units of France